Keijo Tahvanainen (born 28 February 1959) is a Finnish weightlifter. He competed at the 1984 Summer Olympics and the 1992 Summer Olympics.

References

External links
 

1959 births
Living people
Finnish male weightlifters
Olympic weightlifters of Finland
Weightlifters at the 1984 Summer Olympics
Weightlifters at the 1992 Summer Olympics
People from Joensuu
Sportspeople from North Karelia